This is a list of closed railway stations in Norfolk, England.  There are also a number of heritage railway stations in Norfolk, which have been re-opened by preservation societies.  The companies listed are the pre-1923 groupings.

Goods stations

References

See also
Railways in Norfolk

 
Norfolk railway stations
Rail transport in Norfolk
Railway stations Norfolk